Donald O'Brien may refer to:

Donald O'Brien (actor) (1930–2003), French-born Italian film and television actor
Donald Eugene O'Brien (1923–2015), U.S. district judge
Domnall Mór Ua Briain (died 1194), King of Thomond in Ireland (1168–1194)